Klapperich is a surname. Notable people with the surname include:

 Ann Klapperich (born 1976), American basketball player
 Catherine M. Klapperich, American biomedical engineer